Betar, also spelled Beitar, Bethar or Bether, was an ancient Jewish town in the Judean Mountains. Continuously inhabited since the Iron Age, it was the last standing stronghold of the Bar Kokhba revolt, and was destroyed by the Imperial Roman Army under Hadrian in 135 CE.

It is located in the modern Palestinian village of Battir, which preserves its ancient name. The Israeli settlement and city Beitar Illit, named after the ancient city, is also located nearby.

Etymology 
Bet tar in ancient Hebrew might mean the place of the blade, based on the variant spelling found in the Jerusalem Talmud (Codex Leiden), where the place name is written בֵּיתתֹּר, the name may have simply been a contraction of two words: בית + תר, 'bet + tor', meaning, "the house of a dove."

Location 
Deep valleys to the west, north, and east of the hill surround it. The Roman road that connected Jerusalem with Beit Gubrin before going on to Gaza passed through the Valley of Rephaim, which is to the north. It connects by a saddle to another hill to the south, where the remains of the ancient Roman camps can still be seen from the air.

History and archaeology

Iron Age 
The origins of Betar are likely in the Iron Age Kingdom of Judah. It is not mentioned in the Masoretic Text of the Hebrew Bible, but is added in the Septuagint (Codex Sinaiticus) as one of the cities of the Tribe of Judah after Joshua 15:59. The location produced archaeological finds of pottery beginning from 8th century BCE and until late period of the Kingdom of Judah and again from early Roman period.

Between the two revolts 
Following the destruction of Jerusalem during the First-Jewish Roman war, in 70 CE, Betar's importance grew. It is believed that early in Hadrian's rule, Jewish institutions relocated there, probably due to the city's proximity to the destroyed Jerusalem.

Bar Kokhba revolt 

During the Bar Kokhba revolt against the Romans, Betar functioned as the last stronghold of Bar Kokhba, the revolt's commander. A large moat was dug on the south-side of the stronghold, believed to have been made by the inhabitants of the town either before or during the siege, in order to enhance the town's natural defences. Today, modern houses have been built in the depression, along with the planting of fruit trees. Although the general ruin is now used by the villagers of Battir for growing olive trees, along the purlieu of the site can still be seen the partial, extant remains of a Herodian wall and a Herodian tower.The Babylonian Talmud (Sanhedrin 95; Gittin 58, et al.) and the Midrash (in Lamentations Rabbah) mention the city Betar, the siege, and the fate of its inhabitants. The siege was also mentioned by Eusebius and Hieronymus. According to Eusebius, "The war reached its height in the eighteenth year of the reign of Hadrian in Beththera, which was a strong citadel not very far from Jerusalem; the siege lasted a long time before the rebels were driven to final destruction by famine and thirst and the instigator of their madness paid the penalty he deserved."

According to Kennedy and Riley, the size of the two largest camps discovered nearby (A and B) would indicate that there was enough for 6000 and 1800 soldiers during the siege of the city, respectively. It is not definite that Camps C, E, and F were actually temporary Roman camps, but if they are contemporaneous with the addition of more troops in Camps C, D, E, and F, the overall siege force may have been around 10–12,000 soldiers. A stone inscription bearing Latin characters and discovered near the city shows that the Fifth Macedonian Legion and the Eleventh Claudian Legion took part in the siege.

Aftermath 
The destruction of Betar in 135 put an end to the Jewish–Roman wars against Rome, and effectively quashed any Jewish hopes for self-governance in that period. Following the Fall of Betar, the Romans went on a systematic campaign of wiping out the remaining Judean villages, and hunting down refugees and the remaining rebels, with the last pockets of resistance being eliminated by the spring of 136.

Talmud narrative and Jewish tradition 
According to the Jerusalem Talmud, Betar remained a thriving town fifty-two years after the destruction of the Second Temple, until it came to its demise. Modern chroniclers push back the destruction of Betar some years later, making the time-frame brought down in the Jerusalem Talmud hard to reconcile, even if, according to Jewish tradition, the destruction of the Second Temple occurred in 68 CE. Either the time-frame carried in the Talmud is a gross error, or else some of the dates used by modern-day chroniclers are purely anachronistic.

Siege 
According to the Jerusalem Talmud, the city was besieged for three and a half years before it finally fell (Jerusalem Talmud, Taanit 4:5 [13]). According to Jewish tradition, the fortress was breached and destroyed on the fast of Tisha B'Av, in the year 135, on the ninth day of the lunar month Av, a day of mourning for the destruction of the First and the Second Jewish Temple. Earlier, when the Roman army had circumvallated the city (from Latin, circum- + vallum, round-about + rampart), some sixty men of Israel went down and tried to make a breach in the Roman rampart, but to no avail. When they had not returned and were assumed as dead, the Ḥazal permitted their wives to remarry, even though their husbands' bodies had not been retrieved.

Massacre 
The massacre perpetrated against all defenders, including the children who were found in the city, is described by the Jerusalem Talmud.

The Jerusalem Talmud relates that the number of dead in Betar was enormous, that the Romans "went on killing until their horses were submerged in blood to their nostrils." The Romans killed all the defenders except for one Jewish youth whose life was spared, viz. Simeon ben Gamliel.

Hadrian had prohibited the burial of the dead, and so all the bodies remained above ground. According to Jewish legend, they miraculously did not decompose. Many years later Hadrian's successor, Antoninus (Pius), allowed the dead to be afforded a decent burial.

Rabbinical explanation 
Rabbinical literature ascribes the defeat to Bar Kokhba killing his maternal uncle, Rabbi Elazar Hamudaʻi, after suspecting him of collaborating with the enemy, thereby forfeiting Divine protection.

Sources 
Accounts of the Fall of Betar in Talmudic and Midrashic writings reflect and amplify its importance in the Jewish psyche and oral tradition in the subsequent period. The best known is from the Babylonian Talmud, Gittin 57a-58a:

Legacy

Judaism 
The fourth blessing that is said by Israel in the Grace over meals is said to have been enacted by the Ḥazal in recognition of the dead at Betar who, although not afforded proper burial, their bodies did not putrefy and were, at last, brought to burial.

Folklore 
In 1874, French archeologist Clermont-Ganneau visited Battir and cited a local tradition among the local fellahin according which a hard stone known as Hajr el Manjalik, or "the stone of the mangonel," located on a plateau near Khirbet el-Yehud, was said to have been the location where a ruler named El Melek edh-Dhaher set up his cannon batteries to breach the Khirbet el-Yahud. Clermont linked this custom to a "dim memory" of some ancient siege of Battir. J. E. Hanauer cited a similar tale in 1894, although the fellah who showed the explorers the stone claimed that a "Neby" was the one who had "cannonaded" the Jews.

Revisionist and Religious Zionism 

The name of the Revisionist Zionist youth movement Betar (בית"ר) refers to both the last Jewish fort to fall in the Bar Kokhba revolt, and to the slightly altered abbreviation of the Hebrew phrase "Berit Trumpeldor" or "Brit Yosef Trumpeldor" (ברית יוסף תרומפלדור), lit. 'Joseph Trumpeldor Alliance'.

The village of Mevo Betar was established on 24 April 1950 by native Israelis and immigrants from Argentina who were members of the Beitar movement, including Matityahu Drobles, later a member of the Knesset. It was founded in the vicinity of the Betar fortress location, around a kilometre from the Green Line, which gave it the character of an exposed border settlement until the Six-Day War.

Beitar Illit, lit. It was established by a small group of young families from the religious Zionist yeshiva of Machon Meir. The first residents settled in 1990.

References

Bibliography 

 
  (p. 128)
 
 Ussishkin, David, "Archaeological Soundings at Betar, Bar-Kochba's Last Stronghold", in: Tel Aviv. Journal of the Institute of Archaeology of Tel Aviv University 20 (1993) 66ff.

External links 
Survey of Western Palestine, 1880 Map, Map 17:  IAA, Wikimedia commons Coordinates for Bittir (Khurbet el Yehudi): East longitude, 35.08; North latitude, 31.43
 Shimon Gibson (2006), Bethar, Encyclopedia Judaica, based on Encyclopedia Hebraica
 Prof. David Ussishkin, Soundings in Betar, Bar-Kochba's Last Stronghold.
 Other Midrashic sources can be seen here.

130s disestablishments in the Roman Empire
135 disestablishments
Ancient Jewish settlements of Judaea
Ancient villages in Israel
Archaeological sites in the West Bank
Bar Kokhba revolt
Establishments in the Kingdom of Judah
Jews and Judaism in the Roman Republic and the Roman Empire
Massacres in Asia
Revisionist Zionism
Tisha B'Av